Windsor—Walkerville was an electoral riding in Ontario, Canada. It was created in 1934 from part of Essex North. In 1996 it was merged into Windsor—St. Clair before the 1999 election.

Members of Provincial Parliament

References

Former provincial electoral districts of Ontario